Minjujisan is a mountain of South Korea. It has an elevation of 1,242 metres.

See also
List of mountains of Korea

References

Mountains of South Korea
One-thousanders of South Korea
Sobaek Mountains